Çuxanlı (also, Chukhanly, Periatman, Suleymankend, Suleyman-Kent, and Tschuchanly) is a village and municipality in the Salyan Rayon of Azerbaijan.  It has a population of 1,901.  The municipality consists of the villages of Çuxanlı and Qırx Çıraq.

References 

Populated places in Salyan District (Azerbaijan)